The Windfall Formation is a geologic formation in northeastern and southern Nevada.

Areas it is found include the Antelope Valley region of Eureka County and Nye County.

It preserves fossils dating back to the Cambrian period.<

See also

 List of fossiliferous stratigraphic units in Nevada
 Paleontology in Nevada

References

 

Cambrian geology of Nevada
Geography of Eureka County, Nevada
Geography of Nye County, Nevada
Cambrian System of North America
Geologic formations of Nevada
Cambrian southern paleotropical deposits
Ordovician southern paleotropical deposits